Automise is a commercial task automation tool for Windows. Developed by VSoft Technologies, Automise offers a graphical user interface for automating repetitive tasks through the creation of Automise projects. Automise includes a library of 390 built in actions which can be combined with point-and-click to develop automation projects. Automise automation projects can be run using the Automise IDE, Automise command line executable or the free run-time version called Automise Runner.

Built In Actions
Automise's built in actions provide functionality to automate:
 GUI applications by waiting for windows or controls and sending keyboard input or mouse clicks,
 File and directory creation and manipulation,
 Text file and database administration and editing,
 Windows Active Directory,
 Sending email, ICQ and Windows Live Messenger, FTP, HTTP get and TELNET client,
 Windows’ security including file and folder permissions,
 Executing programs, running command line applications or Windows PowerShell scripts,
 Installing, uninstalling, reinstalling and manipulating MSI packages,
 Retrieving a variety of system information for local or remote machines,
 Analysing and defragmenting local and network computers,
 Burning CD/DVDs, creating and burning ISO images, erasing discs,
 Creating, converting, editing and merging PDF files,
 PsTools suite for Windows administration utilities, and
 IIS 5 & 6 administration.

ActionStudio
ActionStudio is a stand-alone IDE for developing custom actions or plugins for Automise. Using JScript, VBScript or .NET languages, users of ActionStudio can create custom Automise Actions to include in their Automise projects. Action files define the properties, events, options and property pages in an XML file format.

See also
 AutoIt
 AutoHotkey
 Automator for macOS
 Keyboard Maestro for macOS
 Macro Express

References

External links
 

Automation software